Udoma Peter Kelvin Amba popularly known by his trademark It's Kel-P Vibes is a Nigerian record producer, singer and songwriter. He is best known for producing and co-writing the Grammy nominated world album African Giant in 2019. He is currently signed to Aristokrat Records, and Universal Music France, with a management deal with Jones Worldwide. Kel-P was credited by OkayAfrica, as one of the key figure who have helped take Afrobeats to new heights. In 2021, he co-produced the Grammy award winning Best Global Music Album Mother Nature by Angélique Kidjo, and Grammy nominated album Made in Lagos (Deluxe version) by Wizkid.

Early life
Udoma Peter Kelvin Amba was born and raised in Lagos State.

Career
In 2016, he met with Sarz, which led to Sarz, helping in creating the song, he was working on at that point in time. Sarz, also helped him in creating his tag "It's Kel-P Vibes". In 2018, he rose to prominent, following his production on Solid Star's single "Eleganza". He has worked with several artistes including Burna Boy, Rema, Niniola, Diamond Platnumz, and Wizkid. With major hits, "Dangote" by Burna Boy, "Peace of Mind" by Rema, "Jeje" by Diamond Platnumz, "Boda Sodiq" & "Fantasy" by Niniola, and "Ghetto Love" by Wizkid.

In 2020, following the partnership between Universal Music Group subsidiary Universal Music France and The Aristokrat Group, the parent company of Aristokrat Records, Kel-P was signed to Universal Music France with a distribution deal with Caroline France. On 24 November 2020, he was nominated at the 63rd Grammy Awards, via Skip Marley album Higher Place, on the song "Faith". On 23 November 2021, he was nominated at the 64th Grammy Awards, via Wizkid album Made in Lagos (Deluxe version), and won his first Grammy award in the same category "Best Global Music Album" for Angélique Kidjo sixteen studio album Mother Nature. On 20 January 2023, he launched his singing career with the release of "One More Night", through Jones Worldwide, and Virgin Records France division, with its accompanying music video directed by Damian Belden, and Luke Shaw.

Production discography

Selected albums produced

Accolades

References 

Living people
Year of birth missing (living people)
Universal Music France artists
Nigerian record producers